Berrington Green is a village in Worcestershire, England near Tenbury Wells.

External links

Villages in Worcestershire
Tenbury Wells